Ali-Akbar Dāvar ( also known as Mirza Ali-Akbar Khan-e Dāvar, 1885 – 9 February 1937) was an Iranian politician and judge and the founder of the modern judicial system of Iran.

Biography
Born in 1885 in Tehran. His father, Kalbali Khan Khazen al Khalvat, was a minor court official in the reign of Mozaffar ad-Din Shah Qajar. In 1900, Davar enrolled in the élite school of Dar ul-Funun (Persia) to study medicine; however, he changed his field of study to law and graduated from the University of Geneva receiving a degree in law in 1908. 

In 1909, he began his career in the judiciary in Iran as a judge in the provincial court. Davar rose the ranks quickly and in 1910 became the public prosecutor of Tehran. He then went on to obtain his law degree in Switzerland . He returned to Iran in 1921 and founded the "Radical party of Iran" (Hizb-e Radical). He also founded the newspaper Mard-e Azad ("The Free Man") in which he published regular comments. He was elected to the 4th, 5th, and 6th Majles as the representative of Varamin from Tehran Province and Lar from Fars Province.

Along with contemporaries such as Abdolhossein Teymourtash and Farman Farmaian, Dāvar took a lead role among the politicians who voted for the abolition of the Qajar dynasty, opposing such parliamentarians as Sayyed Hasan Taqizadeh, Sayyed Hasan Modarres, Yahya Doulatabadi and Mohammad Mossadegh. In 1925, Dāvar became the minister of commerce in the Foroughi Cabinet, and a year later was appointed minister of judicial affairs in the Cabinet of Mostowfi ol-Mamalek. In March 1926, with the approval of parliament, he dissolved Iran's entire judiciary, initiating a wave of fundamental restructuring and overhauling reforms with the aid of French judicial experts.

Iran's modern judicial system was born in April 1927 with 600 newly appointed judges in Tehran. Dāvar subsequently attempted to expand the new system into other cities of Iran through a programme involving training of 250 judges.

Among Dāvar's many achievements are establishing Iran's "Bureau of Social Affairs" (Edareh-ye Sabt-e Ahval), introducing "The Law of Documentation Registration" (Qanun-e Sabt-e Asnad), "The Law of Property Registration" (Qanun-e Sabt-e Amlak), and "The Law of Marriage and Divorce" (Qanun-e Ezdevag va Talāq).

Dāvar also implemented some reforms as minister of finance in the Cabinet of Mohammad-Ali Foroughi. He further established Iran's first state insurance company in the Cabinet of prime minister Mahmud Jam, taking effective steps in saving the state from near bankruptcy by modifying the tax laws.

In December 1936, he proposed a bill to Majles that would seal a large contract with two American companies. The bill came under heavy protest from the British and the Russian governments, putting intense pressure on Dāvar's ministry.

On 10 February 1937 the news of Dāvar's apparent suicide took the capital Tehran by storm. Rumors spread that two days earlier Dāvar had been in private severely reprimanded and threatened by Reza Pahlavi. Some newspapers wrote that he had died of a heart attack, however others suggested that his death had been related to his proposed American bill to Majlis. Davar is said to have died by an overdose of opium.

Four years before, in 1933, Reza Pahlavi had arrested Davar's closest friend Teymourtash.
Teymourtash died shortly afterward in prison. Many say he was killed by the prison's physician through lethal injection on orders of Reza—a method widely used in those days. 

Dāvar is regarded as one of the most productive ministers during Iran's tumultuous years of the early 20th century, who made sweeping reforms to Iran's judicial system. In commemorating Dāvar, Reza Pahlavi is said to have told members of the Judiciary: "Don't ever think that you can become as good as Dāvar, by merely sitting in his chair."

References

Further reading 
 Davar Ardalan, My Name Is Iran: A Memoir (Henry Holt and Co., New York, 2007). , .

External links
 The Judiciary of the Islamic Republic of Iran
 Islamic Republic of Iran Judiciary Public Relations Bureau
 Dāvar's great-granddaughter on NPR

Source used for this article
 'Alí Rizā Awsatí (عليرضا اوسطى), Iran in the past three centuries (Irān dar Se Qarn-e Goz̲ashteh - ايران در سه قرن گذشته), Vol. 2 (Paktāb Publishing - انتشارات پاکتاب, Tehran, Iran, 2003). .

20th-century Iranian politicians
1885 births
1937 deaths
Iranian prosecutors
Members of the National Consultative Assembly
Ministers of Justice of Iran
People from Sari, Iran
Revival Party politicians
University of Geneva alumni